Micker Antony Adolfo Zapata (born September 11, 1996) is a Dominican professional baseball outfielder for the Kansas City Monarchs of the American Association of Professional Baseball.

Career

Chicago White Sox
Adolfo signed with the Chicago White Sox as an international free agent in July 2013. He made his professional debut in 2014 for the AZL White Sox where he batted .218 with five home runs and 21 RBIs, and returned there in 2015, batting .253 in 22 games. In 2016, he played for the Kannapolis Intimidators where he slashed .219/.269/.340 with five home runs and 21 RBIs in 65 games. Adolfo returned to Kannapolis in 2017 where he batted .264 with 16 home runs and 68 RBIs in 112 games. The White Sox added him to their 40-man roster after the 2017 season.

Adolfo spent 2018 with the Winston-Salem Dash, slashing .282/.369/.464 with 11 home runs and 50 RBIs in 79 games. He began 2019 with the Birmingham Barons, but played in only 23 games with them (along with 13 rehab games) during the season to injury. He did not play a minor league game in 2020 due to the cancellation of the minor league season caused by the COVID-19 pandemic. On July 21, 2021, Adolfo made his Triple-A debut against the Durham Bulls, going 0-for-3. Overall in 2021 with Birmingham and the Triple-A Charlotte Knights, Adolfo .245/.311/.520 with 25 Home Runs and 69 RBI's.

Adolfo failed to make the Opening Day roster for the 2022 season and was designated for assignment by the White Sox on April 7, 2022. On April 10, Adolfo was outrighted to Triple-A Charlotte. Adolfo played in 96 games for Triple-A Charlotte, slashing .231/.287/.417 with 15 home runs, 37 RBI, and 8 stolen bases. He elected free agency following the season on November 10, 2022.

Kansas City Monarchs
On March 14, 2023, Adolfo signed with the Kansas City Monarchs of the American Association of Professional Baseball.

References

External links

Minor league baseball players
1996 births
Living people
Arizona League White Sox players
Baseball outfielders
Birmingham Barons players
Dominican Republic expatriate baseball players in the United States
Estrellas Orientales players
Glendale Desert Dogs players
Kannapolis Intimidators players
Sportspeople from San Pedro de Macorís
Winston-Salem Dash players